Movin' Melodies is a record label from Dutch producer Patrick Prins. The Movin' Melodies label was created in 1992 and was quickly recognized as one of the originators of the handbag / hardbag sound. In the years following the initial releases on the Movin' Melodies label, Patrick Prins worked with numerous other producers one of them being German producer ATB, who later used the Movin' Melodies name for his debut studio album.

Unlike the singles, the typical ATB-sound is hardly used on the album's other tracks. Tanneberger did not want to put together a pure dance album. Therefore, in addition to more club-oriented songs, there are also quiet, melodic tracks that reflect his preference for sound compositions by Enigma, Mike Oldfield and Jean Michel Jarre. Track 12 ("Beach Vibes") is commonly misnamed as "Ocean Trance".

On Spotify, tracks 7 and 12 are omitted from the tracklist.

Track listing

Charts and certifications

Charts

Certifications

References

ATB albums
1999 debut albums